The 2013 European 10 m Events Championships were held in Odense, Denmark from February 25 to March 3, 2013.

Men's events

Women's events

Mixed events

Men's Junior events

Women's Junior events

Mixed Junior events

Medal summary

Seniors

Juniors

See also
 European Shooting Confederation
 International Shooting Sport Federation
 List of medalists at the European Shooting Championships
 List of medalists at the European Shotgun Championships

References

External links
 Official Website

European Shooting Championships
European Shooting Championships
2013 European Shooting Championships
European 10 m Events Championships
Sport in Odense
Shooting competitions in Denmark